The Victorian Architecture Awards are   granted annually by the Victorian Chapter of the Australian Institute of Architects. They began with the Street Architecture Medal, awarded between 1929 and 1942. Apart from a single award in 1954, annual awards did not resume until 1964, backdated by one year.

To mark the 75th Victorian Architecture Awards in 2003, the Institute published Judging Architecture – Issues, Divisions, Triumphs, which lists all awards since 1929.

Awards 
The most prestigious award has been variously called the Medal, the Bronze Medal, or Merit Award, but since but since 1987 it has been called the Victorian Architecture Medal.

The numbers and categories of awards has expanded and changed over the years. Since the 1990s, some categories have been named after famous architects or firms who have practiced in Victoria.

Current awards include:
 Victorian Architecture Medal
 William Wardell Award for Public / Institutional Architecture
 Public Architecture Award (Alterations and Additions)
 Joseph Reed Award for Urban Design
 Sir Osborn McCutcheon Award for Commercial Architecture
 John George Knight Award for Heritage Architecture / Conservation
 Harold Desbrowe-Annear Award for Residential Architecture Houses – New
 John and Phyllis Murphy Award for Residential Architecture Houses – Alterations and Additions 
 Best Overend Award for Residential Architecture – Multiple Housing
 Kevin Borland Award for Small Project Architecture
 Henry Bastow Award for Educational Architecture
 Allan and Beth Coldicutt Award for Sustainable Architecture 
 Colorbond Award for Steel Architecture
 Award for Enduring Architecture
 Melbourne Prize
 Regional Prize
 Bates Smart Award for Architecture in the Media
 President's Prize for the Hall of Fame
 25 Year Award

References

External links 
 Victorian Architecture Awards – Major categories

Architecture awards
Awards established in 1929
1929 establishments in Australia